Aspergillus alliaceus is a species of fungus in the genus Aspergillus. It is from the Flavi section.  It was first described scientifically by Charles Thom  and Margaret Church in 1926. Its associated teleomorph is Petromyces alliaceus. It has yellow spores.

Growth and morphology

A. alliaceus has been cultivated on both Czapek yeast extract agar (CYA) plates and Malt Extract Agar Oxoid® (MEAOX) plates. The growth morphology of the colonies can be seen in the pictures below.

References

alliaceus
Fungi described in 1926
Taxa named by Charles Thom